Bats (also Batsi, Batsbi, Batsb, Batsaw, Tsova-Tush) is the endangered language of the Bats people, a North Caucasian minority group and is part of the Nakh family of Northeast Caucasian languages. It had 2,500 to 3,000 speakers in 1975.

There is only one dialect. It exists only as a spoken language, as Bats people use Georgian as their written language. The language is not mutually intelligible with either Chechen or Ingush, the other two members of the Nakh family.

History
Tusheti, the northeastern mountainous region of Georgia, is home to four tribes that consider themselves Tushetians: the Batsbi - also known as Tsovatush; the Gometsari; the Piriqiti; and the Chagma-Tush. Tsovatush people make up 50% of Tushetians. As of today only several hundred Tsovatush people speak Batsbur Mott – (Bats language), whereas the other tribes (Gometsari, Piriqiti and Chagma-Tush) have lost the language. Evidence from toponymics indicates that the other three Tushetian tribes formerly spoke Bats, suggesting that all Tushetians once did and over time the Georgian language replaced Bats. 

Here are a few examples of the Bats language as spoken by the Gometsari, Piriqiti and Chagma-Tush tribes:Omalo – name of a village. Bats, "Won't give up." O-(it) ma-(not) lo-(given or given up).Tcokalta – name of a village.  Bats, "fox mountain". Tcokal - (Fox) ta- (Mountain).Maqalati – during festivals the term is used to describe people (with wooden swords) serving the guests - they are the hosts and peacekeepers. "Standing above" in Bats, like an overseer/peacekeeper. Maqa – above or over latt – stand.Dalaoba – Dalla – Bats, God. Qokebi – Qoki''' – Bats, foot, foot wear".

The Bats language helps shed light to the history of the Tushetian mountains. The mountainous terrain preserved the culture and traditions of Tushetians, but the history of isolation makes it more difficult to document them as only a few records exist.

Classification
Bats belongs to the Nakh family of Northeast Caucasian languages.

Geographic distribution
Most speakers of Bats live in the village of Zemo-Alvani, on the Kakhetia Plain, in the Akhmeta Municipality of Georgia. There are some families of Bats in Tbilisi and other bigger towns in Georgia.

Phonology

Vowels 
Bats has a typical triangular five-vowel system with short–long contrast (except for u, which has no long form). Bats also has a number of diphthongs, ei, ui, oi, ai, ou, and au. All vowels and diphthongs have nasalized allophones that are the result of phonetic and morphophonemic processes; this is represented by a superscript n, as in kʼnateⁿ boy-GEN.

Consonants 
Bats has a relatively typical consonant inventory for a Northeast Caucasian language. Unlike its close relatives, Chechen and Ingush, Bats has retained the lateral fricative /ɬ/. Also notable is the presence of two geminate ejectives, tːʼ and qːʼ, which are cross-linguistically rare.

Grammar

The first grammar of Bats, Über die Thusch-Sprache, was compiled by the German orientalist Anton Schiefner (1817–1879), making it into the first grammar of an indigenous Caucasian language based on sound scientific principles.

Noun classes
Traditional analyses posit that Bats has eight noun classes, the highest number among the Northeast Caucasian languages; however, a more recent analysis gives only five classes. This analysis (not unlike analyses of Lak) yields the grouping shown below:

Under this analysis, the additional three classes are examples of inquorate gender, where the number of items displaying this behavior are insufficient to constitute an independent grouping. Furthermore, they can be explained as inflecting one class in the singular, and another in the plural, e.g. the B/B group agrees as if it belonged to the Bd class in the singular but the male human class in the plural.

Noun cases
Batsbi makes use of nine noun cases total, though in the majority of nouns, the ergative and instrumental cases have a common form.

Numerals
Like most of its relatives, Bats' numerals are vigesimal, using 20 as a common base. This is mainly evident in the construction of higher decads, so that 40  šauztʼqʼ formed from 2 × 20 and 200 icʼatʼqʼ is 10 × 20. When modifying nominals, the numeral precedes the noun it modifies.

In Bats, as in its closest relatives Chechen and Ingush, the number Dʕivʔ "four" actually begins with a noun-class marker, represented by D (by default, or another capital for the other classes). This marker will agree in class with the class of the nominal which the number modifies, even if that nominal is not overtly expressed and is only apparent through pragmatic or discursive context, as in Vʕivʔev "four (males)". This is seen in the word "four" itself as well as its derivatives.

Verbs
Bats has explicit inflections for agentivity of a verb; it makes a distinction between  I fell down (i.e. through no fault of my own) and  I fell down (i.e. and it was my own fault).

References

External links 

 The Red Book of Peoples of the Russian Empire: The Bats
 Languages of the World report 
 Bats basic lexicon at the Global Lexicostatistical Database

Northeast Caucasian languages
Languages of Georgia (country)
Endangered Caucasian languages